Daniel De Leon (December 14, 1852 – May 11, 1914), alternatively spelt Daniel de León, was a Curaçaoan-American  socialist newspaper editor, politician, Marxist theoretician, and trade union organizer. He is regarded as the forefather of the idea of revolutionary industrial unionism and was the leading figure in the Socialist Labor Party of America from 1890 until the time of his death. De Leon was a co-founder of the Industrial Workers of the World and much of his ideas and philosophy contributed to the creations of Socialist Labor parties across the world, including: Australia, the United Kingdom, Canada, and the Socialist Trade and Labor Alliance.

Biography

Early life and academic career
Daniel De Leon was born December 14, 1852, in Curaçao, the son of Salomon de Leon and Sarah Jesurun De Leon. His father was a surgeon in the Royal Netherlands Army and a colonial official. Although he was raised Catholic, his family ancestry is believed to be  Dutch Jewish of the Spanish and Portuguese community; "De León" is a Spanish surname, oftentimes toponymic, in which case it can possibly indicate a family's geographic origin in the Medieval Kingdom of León.

His father lived in the Netherlands before coming to Curaçao when receiving his commission in the military. Salomon De Leon died on January 18, 1865, when Daniel was twelve and was the first to be buried in the new Jewish cemetery.

De Leon left Curaçao on April 15, 1866 and arrived in Hamburg on May 22. In Germany he studied at the Gymnasium in Hildesheim and in 1870 began attending the University of Leiden in the Netherlands. He studied medicine at Leiden and was a member of the Amsterdam student corps, but did not graduate. While in Europe he had become fluent in German, Dutch, French, English, ancient Greek and Latin, in addition to his first language Spanish. Sometime between 1872 and 1874 he emigrated to New York, with his wife and mother. There he found work as an instructor in Latin, Greek and mathematics at Thomas B. Harrington's School in Westchester, New York. In 1876 he entered Columbia College, now Columbia University, earning an LLB with honors 1878.

From 1878 to 1882, he lived in Brownsville, Texas, as a practicing attorney, then returned to New York. While he maintained an attorney's office until 1884 he was more interested in pursuing an academic career at his alma mater, Columbia. A prize lectureship had been created in 1882. To be eligible a candidate had to be a graduate of Columbia, a member of the Academy of Political Science and read at least one paper before the academy. The three year appointment came with a $500 annual salary ($ in  terms) and required the lecturer to give twenty lectures a year, based on original research, to the students of the School of Political Science. De Leon devoted his lectures to Latin American diplomacy and the interventions of European powers in South American affairs. He received his first term in 1883 and his second term in 1886. In 1889 he was not kept on. Some allege that the University officials denied him a promised full professorship because of his political activities, while other believe that his subject was too esoteric to be a permanent part of the curriculum.

De Leon published no papers about Latin America during this period, but he did contribute an article to the debut issue of the Academy's Political Science Quarterly on the Berlin West Africa Conference. He also wrote reviews on Franz von Holtzendorff's Handbuch des Völkerrechts in June 1888 and its French translation in March 1889 for the same publication.

Personal life

De Leon traveled back to Curaçao to marry the 16-year-old Sarah Lobo from Caracas, Venezuela. The Lobo were a prominent Jewish family in the area that lived in both the Dutch Antilles and  Venezuela. After a traditional Jewish wedding in Caracas the family moved to a Spanish speaking area of Manhattan, at 112 West 14th street where their first son, Solon De Leon would be born on September 2, 1883. By the mid to late 1880s the family was living in the Lower East Side. In 1885 or 1886 another child, Grover Cleveland De Leon was born but only lived a year and a half. On April 29, 1887 Sarah Lobo De Leon died in childbirth while delivering stillborn twins; it was the same year that Grover had died. After this the De Leons left the Lower East Side and moved in with their housekeeper Mary Redden Maguire at 1487 Avenue A.

In 1891, while on a speaking tour around the country for the SLP, De Leon found himself in Kansas when he learned that a planned speaking engagement in Lawrence had been canceled. He decided to head to Independence, Kansas where he had been advised there was some sympathy for the socialist movement. He arrived on April 23 and was hosted by a 26-year-old school teacher, Bertha Canary, who was the head of a local Bellamyite group, the Christian Socialist Club. Canary was familiar with De Leon, having read some of his articles in the Nationalist Club movement press, and the two apparently became infatuated with each other. She was a member of a Congregational Church and in 1892 they were married in South Norwalk, Connecticut. They had five children: Florence, Gertrude, Paul, Donald and Genseric. He named the latter, according to Solon De Leon, after the medieval king Genseric, a Vandal who made the Pope kiss his toes.

Political career
De Leon settled in New York City, studying at Columbia University. He was a Georgist socialist during the 1886 Mayoral campaign of Henry George and in 1890 joined the Socialist Labor Party, becoming the editor of its newspaper, The People. He quickly grew in stature inside the party and in 1891, 1902, and 1904 he ran for the governorship of the state of New York, winning more than 15,000 votes in 1902, his best result.

De Leon became a Marxist in the late 1880s, and argued for the revolutionary overthrow of capitalism, trying to divert the SLP away from its Lassallian outlook. Some argue that his famous polemic with James Connolly showed him to have been an advocate of Ferdinand Lassalle's subsistence theory of wages. Others question this assertion because by the same logic Marx and Engels could be described as advocates of the Iron Law because language in The Communist Manifesto and Value, Price and Profit pertaining to the level of wages and temporary effect of union activity on working conditions is similar to the language used by De Leon in his answer to Connolly, and the 'iron law of wages' is a Malthusian theory which De Leon did not indicate any support for.

De Leon was highly critical of the trade union movement in America and described the craft-oriented American Federation of Labor as the "American Separation of Labor". At this early stage in De Leon's development, there was still a considerable remnant of the general unionist Knights of Labor in existence, and the SLP worked within it until being driven out. This resulted in the formation of the Socialist Trade and Labor Alliance (ST&LA) in 1895, which was dominated by the SLP.

By the early 20th Century, the SLP was declining in numbers, with first the Social Democratic Party and then the Socialist Party of America becoming the leading leftist political force in America (as these splinter groups embraced capitalist reforms). De Leon was an important figure in the US labor movement, and in 1904 he attended the International Socialist Congress, held in Amsterdam. Under the influence of the American Labor Union (ALU), he changed his politics around this time to put more focus on industrial unionism, and the ballot as a purely destructive weapon, in contrast to his earlier view of political organization as 'sword' and industrial union as 'shield'. He worked with the ALU in the founding of the Industrial Workers of the World (IWW) in 1905. His participation in this organization was short-lived and acrimonious.
 
De Leon later accused the IWW of having been taken over by what he called disparagingly 'the bummery'. De Leon was engaged in a policy dispute with the leaders of the IWW. His argument was in support of political action via the Socialist Labor Party while other leaders, including founder Big Bill Haywood, argued instead for direct action. Haywood's faction prevailed, resulting in a change to the Preamble which precluded "affiliation with any political party." De Leon's followers left the IWW to form a rival Detroit-based IWW, which was renamed the Workers' International Industrial Union in 1915, and collapsed in 1925.

Death and legacy

De Leon was formally expelled from the Chicago IWW after calling proponents of that organization "slum proletarians". His Socialist Labor Party has remained influential, largely by keeping his ideas alive.

De Leon died on May 11, 1914 of Septic Endocarditis at Mount Sinai Hospital in Manhattan, New York.

Daniel De Leon proved hugely influential to other socialists, also outside the US.  For example, in the UK, a Socialist Labour Party was formed.  De Leon's hopes for peaceful and bloodless revolution also influenced Antonio Gramsci's concept of passive revolution. George Seldes quotes Lenin saying on the fifth anniversary of the revolution, "... What we have done in Russia is accept the De Leon interpretation of Marxism, that is what the Bolsheviki adopted in 1917."

Electoral history 

De Leon ran in 1891 for Governor of New York and received 14,651 votes. He ran in 1893 for Secretary of State of New York and received 20,034 votes. He ran again in 1902 for Governor and received 15,886 votes. He ran in 1903 for the New York Court of Appeals. He ran again in 1904 for Governor and received 8,976 votes.

Works 
 Reform or Revolution?, speech, 1896.
 What Means This Strike?, speech, 1898.
 Socialism vs Anarchism, speech, 1901.
 The Mysteries of the People, a series of 19 novels translated from Eugène Sue's text, 1904.
 Two Pages from Roman History
 The Burning Question of Trade Unionism
 Preamble of the IWW, later renamed The Socialist Reconstruction of Society.
 DeLeon Replies ... (short essay, 1904)

Notes 
Notes

Citations

Further reading 
 Stephen Coleman, Daniel De Leon, Manchester, England: Manchester University Press.
 W.J. Ghent, "Daniel De Leon" in Dictionary of American Biography. New York: American Council of Learned Societies, 1928-1936.
 Lewis Hanke The first lecturer on Hispanic American diplomatic history. Durham, N.C., 1936 (Reprinted from The Hispanic American historical review, vol. XVI, no. 3, August, 1936)
 Frank Girard and Ben Perry, Socialist Labor Party, 1876-1991: A Short History. Philadelphia: Livra Books, 1991.
 David Herreshoff, "Daniel De Leon: The Rise of Marxist Politics," in Harvey Goldberg ed. American Radicals: Some Problems and Personalities. New York, Monthly Review Press, 1957.
 American Disciples of Marx: From the Age of Jackson to the Progressive Era. Detroit: Wayne State University Press, 1967.
 Olive M. Johnson, Daniel De Leon, American Socialist Pathfinder. New York: New York Labor News Company, 1923.
 Olive M. Johnson and Henry Kuhn, The Socialist Labor Party: During Four Decades, 1890-1930.  Part 1. Part 2. New York: New York Labor News Company, 1931.
 Charles A. Madison, "Daniel De Leon: Apostle of Socialism," Antioch Review, vol. 5, no. 3 (Autumn 1945), pp. 402–414. In JSTOR
 Arnold Petersen, Daniel DeLeon: Social Architect. New York: New York Labor News Company, 1942.
 Leonid Raiskii, Daniel De Leon; the struggle against opportunism in the American labor movement, New York: New York Labor News Co., 1932.
 Carl Reeve, The Life and Times of Daniel De Leon. New York:AIMS/Humanities Press, 1972.
 L. Glen Seratan, Daniel DeLeon: The Odyssey of an American Marxist, Cambridge, MA: [Harvard University Press, 1979.
 "Daniel De Leon as American," Wisconsin Magazine of History, vol. 61, no. 3 (Spring 1978), pp. 210–223. In JSTOR.
 Daniel De Leon: The Man and his Work: A Symposium. New York: National Executive Committee, Socialist Labor Party, 1919.
 Golden jubilee of De Leonism, 1890-1940: Commemorating the Fiftieth Anniversary of the Founding of the Socialist labor party. New York: National Executive Committee, Socialist Labor Party, 1940.
 Fifty years of American Marxism, 1891-1941: Commemorating the Fiftieth Anniversary of the Founding of the Weekly People. New York: National Executive Committee, Socialist Labor Party, 1940.
 The Vatican in Politics: Ultramontanism, New York Labor News Company 1962

External links 

 Socialist Labor Party official website.
 Daniel De Leon Internet Archive at the Marxists Internet Archive.
 Deleonism.org
 
 

 
1852 births
1914 deaths
Curaçao emigrants to the United States
Curaçao Jews
American Sephardic Jews
Industrial Workers of the World members
Jewish socialists
Libertarian Marxists
Libertarian socialists
Marxist theorists
American Marxists
American newspaper editors
American syndicalists
American communists
American people of Dutch-Jewish descent
American people of Spanish-Jewish descent
Dutch emigrants to the United States
Columbia College (New York) alumni
Columbia University faculty
Socialist Labor Party of America politicians from New York (state)
19th-century Sephardi Jews
20th-century Sephardi Jews
Socialist Labor Party of America
19th-century American politicians
New York (state) socialists
Trade unionists from New York (state)
Deaths from endocarditis
Infectious disease deaths in New York (state)